Mahmut of Karaman  was a bey  of Karaman Beylik, a Turkish principality in Anatolia in the 14th century.
 
His father was Karaman Bey, who succeeded his elder brother Güneri in 1300. Although he is known to have  participated in the campaign to Alaiye during Güneri's reign, the details of his reign are not known. After the death of Hethum II in 1307, he took advantage of the weakened Armenian Kingdom of Cilicia and captured some of their territories. But when Seljuk sultan Mesud II died in 1308, he turned back and saw his chance to capture Konya, the Seljuk capital.

He died in 1312. His tomb is in Balkusan village at Ermenek district of Karaman Province. He was succeeded by his son Musa.

References

Karamanids
1312 deaths
Year of birth unknown
13th-century births
14th-century monarchs in Asia
Ethnic Afshar people